Dean Strong (born July 17, 1985) is a Canadian former professional ice hockey player who last played for HC Valpellice of the Italian Elite.A.

Playing career
Undrafted and prior to turning professional, he attended the University of Vermont, where he played four seasons of NCAA Division I college hockey with the Vermont Catamounts men's ice hockey team. In his final year with Vermont as a senior in the 2008–09 season, he set a Vermont record when he appeared in his 154th-straight game with the Catamounts. He also captained the team to the Frozen Four.

On August 4, 2011, Strong signed a one-year deal to remain contracted with the Kalamazoo Wings of the ECHL for his third professional season in 2011–12. After beginning the year with the Chicago Wolves, Strong played in 21 games for the Wings, posting 23 points, before he was loaned to the Lake Erie Monsters for the remainder of their regular season. He appeared in a career-high 54 games AHL for 17 points.

Strong was signed to a one-year AHL contract to return to the Lake Erie Monsters for the following season. Suffering an early injury and used as a reserve forward, Strong was loaned to the Central Hockey League affiliate, the Denver Cutthroats, on December 5, 2012. After 3 games he returned to the Monsters and claimed a regular checking line role to contribute with 13 points in 36 games.

As a free agent, Strong was signed to his second European contract, with Italian club, HC Valpellice, on September 2, 2013.

Career statistics

Awards and honours

References

External links

1985 births
Living people
Canadian ice hockey forwards
Chicago Wolves players
Denver Cutthroats players
ETC Crimmitschau players
Ice hockey people from Ontario
Kalamazoo Wings (ECHL) players
Lake Erie Monsters players
HC Valpellice players
Sportspeople from Mississauga
Vermont Catamounts men's ice hockey players
Vernon Vipers players
Worcester Sharks players
Canadian expatriate ice hockey players in Italy
Canadian expatriate ice hockey players in Germany